, the son of Iriki-In Shigetoshi, was a vassal under the Shimazu clan of Satsuma. The lord of the Shimazu clan, Shimazu Katsuhisa, suffered the rebellion of a kinsman, Sanehisa, and was forced to flee Satsuma during 1526. The Shimazu clan head was then passed on to Katsuhisa's eldest son, Shimazu Takahisa. Even though Takahisa was the new head, Katsuhisa still had authority over a good amount of land. Considering Shigetomo's lands were very close to that of the Shimazu's, he found himself in conflicts between the Sanehisa around Momotosugi.

In Katsuhisa's attempt to increase the prestige of the Iriki-In clan, he awarded Shigetomo with the Momotosugi Castle. Katsuhisa also rewarded their clan with the Koriyama Castle the following year.

During 1539, Shigetomo stormed the Momotsugi in a night raid. This event increased Shigetomo's reputation, earning the respect of Shimazu Takahisa, and earning a new castle. During the following year, Shigetomo overcame many forts such as the Hirasa, Kuma no sho, Miyasato, Tazaki, and Takea, also gaining prominence within Satsuma for his clan. During the year to follow however, Shigetomo and Shimazu Takahisa's relationship between each other began to sour. This was due to rumors that Shigetomo was plotting a rebellion against Takahisa, even though Shigetomo's younger sister was the wife of Takahisa and mother of the Shimazu heir, Yoshihisa.

In 1544 Shigetomo died and Takahisa took his Koriyama Castle.

Daimyo
1544 deaths
Year of birth unknown